Eldred Gregory Peck (April 5, 1916 – June 12, 2003) was an American actor and one of the most popular film stars from the 1940s to the 1970s. In 1999, the American Film Institute named Peck the 12th-greatest male star of Classic Hollywood Cinema.

After studying at the Neighborhood Playhouse with Sanford Meisner, Peck began appearing in stage productions, acting in over 50 plays and three Broadway productions. He first gained critical success in The Keys of the Kingdom (1944), a John M. Stahl–directed drama which earned him his first Academy Award nomination. He starred in a series of successful films, including romantic-drama The Valley of Decision (1944), Alfred Hitchcock's Spellbound (1945), and family film The Yearling (1946). He encountered lukewarm commercial reviews at the end of the 1940s, his performances including The Paradine Case (1947) and The Great Sinner (1948). Peck reached global recognition in the 1950s and 1960s, appearing back-to-back in the book-to-film adaptation of Captain Horatio Hornblower (1951) and biblical drama David and Bathsheba (1951). He starred alongside Ava Gardner in The Snows of Kilimanjaro (1952) and Audrey Hepburn in Roman Holiday (1953), which earned Peck a Golden Globe award.

Other notable films in which he appeared include  Moby Dick (1956, and its 1998 mini-series), The Guns of Navarone (1961), Cape Fear (1962, and its 1991 remake), The Omen (1976), and The Boys from Brazil (1978). Throughout his career, he often portrayed protagonists with "fiber" within a moral setting. Gentleman's Agreement (1947) centered on topics of antisemitism, while Peck's character in Twelve O'Clock High (1949) dealt with post-traumatic stress disorder during World War II. He won the Academy Award for Best Actor for his performance as Atticus Finch in To Kill a Mockingbird (1962), an adaptation of the modern classic of the same name which revolved around racial inequality, for which he received universal acclaim. In 1983, he starred opposite Christopher Plummer in The Scarlet and The Black as Hugh O'Flaherty, a Catholic priest who saved thousands of escaped Allied POWs and Jewish people in Rome during the Second World War.

Peck was also active in politics, challenging the House Un-American Activities Committee in 1947 and was regarded as a political opponent by President Richard Nixon. President Lyndon B. Johnson honored Peck with the Presidential Medal of Freedom in 1969 for his lifetime humanitarian efforts. Peck died in his sleep from bronchopneumonia at the age of 87.

Early life 
Eldred Gregory Peck was born on April 5, 1916, in the neighborhood of La Jolla in San Diego, California, to Bernice Mae "Bunny" (née Ayres; 1894–1992), and Gregory Pearl Peck (1886–1962), a Rochester, New York–born chemist and pharmacist.  His father was of English (paternal) and Irish (maternal) heritage, and his mother was of English and Scots ancestry. She converted to her husband's religion, Catholicism, and Peck was raised as a Catholic. Through his Irish-born paternal grandmother Catherine Ashe (1864–1926), Peck was related to Thomas Ashe (1885–1917), who participated in the Easter Rising less than three weeks after Peck's birth and died while being force-fed during a hunger strike in 1917.

Peck's parents divorced when he was five, and he was brought up by his maternal grandmother, who took him to the movies every week. At the age of 10, he was sent to a Catholic military school, St. John's Military Academy in Los Angeles. While he was a student there, his grandmother died. At 14, he moved back to San Diego to live with his father. He attended San Diego High School, and after graduating in 1934, enrolled for one year at San Diego State Teacher's College (now known as San Diego State University). While there, he joined the track team, took his first theatre and public-speaking courses, and pledged the Epsilon Eta fraternity. Peck had ambitions to be a doctor, and later transferred to the University of California, Berkeley, as an English major and pre-medical student. Standing , he rowed on the university crew. Although his tuition fee was only $26 per year, Peck still struggled to pay and took a job as a "hasher" (kitchen helper) for the Gamma Phi Beta sorority in exchange for meals.

At Berkeley, Peck's deep, well-modulated voice gained him attention, and after participating in a public speaking course, he decided to try acting. He was encouraged by an acting coach, who saw in him perfect material for university theatre, and he became more and more interested in acting. He was recruited by Edwin Duerr, director of the university's Little Theater, and appeared in five plays during his senior year, including as Starbuck in Moby Dick. Peck later said about his years at Berkeley that "it was a very special experience for me and three of the greatest years of my life. It woke me up and made me a human being." In 1996, Peck donated $25,000 to the Berkeley rowing crew in honor of his coach, the renowned Ky Ebright.

Career

Beginnings and stage roles (1939–1943)
Peck did not graduate with his friends because he lacked one course. His college friends were concerned for him and wondered how he would get along without his degree. "I have all I need from the university", he told them. Peck dropped the name "Eldred" and headed to New York City to study at the Neighborhood Playhouse with the legendary acting teacher Sanford Meisner. He was often broke, and sometimes slept in Central Park. He worked at the 1939 World's Fair as a barker, and Rockefeller Center as a tour guide for NBC television, and at Radio City Music Hall. He dabbled in modelling before, in 1940, working in exchange for food at the Barter Theatre in Abingdon, Virginia, where he appeared in five plays, including Family Portrait and On Earth As It Is.

His stage career began in 1941, when he played the secretary in a Katharine Cornell production of George Bernard Shaw's play The Doctor's Dilemma. The play opened in San Francisco just one week before the attack on Pearl Harbor. He made his Broadway debut as the lead in Emlyn Williams' The Morning Star in 1942. His second Broadway performance that year was in The Willow and I with Edward Pawley. Peck's acting abilities were in high demand during World War II since he had been exempted from military service because of a back injury suffered while receiving dance and movement lessons from Martha Graham as part of his acting training. Twentieth Century Fox later claimed he had injured his back while rowing at university, but in Peck's words, "In Hollywood, they didn't think a dance class was macho enough, I guess. I've been trying to straighten out that story for years." Peck performed in a total of 50 plays, including three short-lived Broadway productions, 4–5 road tours, and summer theater.

Rapid critical and commercial success (1944–1946)

After gaining stage recognition, Peck was offered his first film role, the male lead in the war-romance Days of Glory (1944), directed by Jacques Tourneur, alongside top-billed Tamara Toumanova, a Russian-born ballerina. Peck portrayed the leader of Russian guerrillas resisting the Germans in 1941 who stumble across a beautiful Russian dancer (Toumanova), who had been sent to entertain Russian troops, and protect her by letting her join their group. During production of the film, Tourneur "untrained" Peck from his theater training where he was used to speaking in a formal manner and projecting his voice to the entire hall. Peck considered his performance in the film as quite amateurish and did not wish to watch the film after it was released. The film lost money at the box office, disappeared from theaters quickly, and was largely dismissed by critics. 

At the time of the film's release, critic Bosley Crowther of The New York Times assessed it as slow-moving and verbose, adding that Peck's acting was stiff.  Film historian Barry Monush has written, "Peck's star power was evident from the word go." Following the release of the film, Peck gained the attention of producers, but rather than participating in the studio system, he decided to remain a freelancer with the ability to choose his roles, signing non-exclusive contracts with four studios, including an unusual dual contract with 20th Century Fox and Gone With the Wind producer David O. Selznick.

Peck's second movie, The Keys of the Kingdom (1944), features him as an 80-year-old Roman Catholic priest looking back at his undertakings during over half a century spent as a determined, self-sacrificing missionary in China. The film shows the character aging  from his 20s to 80; Peck featured in almost every scene.  The film was nominated for four Academy Awards, including the Academy Award for Best Actor, which was Peck's first nomination. Although the film finished only 27th at the box office in North America for 1944, Jay Carr of Turner Classic Movies refers to it as Peck's breakthrough performance while writer Patrick McGilligan says that it "catapulted him to stardom". At the time of release, Peck's performance was lauded by Variety and The New York Times, amidst mixed reviews for the film itself. The Radio Times referred to it as "a long, talkative and rather undramatic picture" but admitted that "its success saved Peck's career". Craig Butler of AllMovie states "he gives a commanding performance, full of his usual quiet dignity and intelligence, and spiked with stubbornness and an inner fire that make the character truly come alive."

In The Valley of Decision (1944), a romantic drama about intermingling social classes, Peck plays the eldest son of a wealthy steel mill owner in 1870s Pittsburgh who has a romance with one of his family's maids, portrayed by Greer Garson. who was nominated for the Academy Award for Best Actress.  Upon release, reviews from The New York Times and Variety were somewhat positive, with Peck's performance described as commanding. It was North America's highest-grossing movie of 1945.

Peck's next film was the first of two collaborations with director Alfred Hitchcock, the suspense-romance Spellbound (1945), opposite Ingrid Bergman. Peck plays a man who is thought to be the new director of the psychiatric facility where Bergman's character works as a psychoanalyst, while his amnesia and disturbing visions suggest he may be a murderer. Peck and Hitchcock were described as having a cordial but cool relationship. Hitchcock initially hoped that Cary Grant would play the male lead. Peck later stated that he thought he was too young when he first worked with Hitchcock, and that the director's on-set indifference to his character's motivation, important to Peck's acting style, shook his confidence. Peck's chemistry clicked with his screen partner Bergman; the actors were romantically linked at the time.

Released at the end of 1945, Spellbound was a hit, ranking as the third-most successful film of 1946. Spellbound was well received by critics at the time, as was Peck's performance. Bosley Crowther of The New York Times praised the film, stating that Peck's performance "restrained and refined, is precisely the proper counter to Bergman's exquisite role;"  Frank Miller of Turner Classic Movies has written that the movie continued the rise of Peck into a Hollywood star and even "a major sex symbol". Producer David O. Selznick noted that during preview tests of the movie, the women in the audiences had substantive reactions to the appearance of Peck's name during the opening credits, stating that during his first few scenes the audience had to be shushed to quiet down. Spellbound was nominated for six Academy Awards including Best Picture, although it was not in the National Board of Review's top ten films of the year.

In The Yearling (1946), Peck portrays a kind-hearted father, opposite onscreen wife, Jane Wyman, whose son finds and insists on raising a three-day-old fawn in 1870s Florida. Reviews upon release were very positive with Bosley Crowther evaluating it as a film that "provides a wealth of satisfaction that few films ever attain". The Yearling was a box office success finishing with the ninth highest box office gross for 1947 and landed six Academy Award nominations, including Best Actor. Peck won the Golden Globe for Best Actor for performance. In recent decades, it has continued to receive critical praise with Barry Monush writing, it is "one of the best-made and most-loved family films of its day".

Peck took his first "against type" role, as a cruel, amoral cowboy in the western soap opera Duel in the Sun (1946) with top-billed Jennifer Jones as the provocative, temptress object of Peck's love, anger and desire. Their chemistry is described by film historian David Thomson as "a constant knife fight of sensuality". Also starring Joseph Cotten as Peck's righteous half brother and competitor for the affections of the "steamy, sexpot" character of Jones, the movie was resoundingly criticized, and even banned in some cities, due to its lurid nature. The publicity around the eroticism of Duel in the Sun, one of the biggest movie advertising campaigns in history, used a new tactic of opening in hundreds of theaters across the U.S. at once, saturating the theaters in cities where it opened, resulting in the film being the second highest-grossing movie of both 1947 and the 1940s. Nicknamed "Lust in the Dust", the film received mostly negative reviews upon release, such as Bosley Crowther writing that "performances are strangely uneven", although Jones received a nomination for the Academy Award for Best Actress. The opinions of Peck's performance have been polarized.

Critical successes and commercial lows (1947–1949) 
In 1947, Peck co-founded The La Jolla Playhouse, at his birthplace, with Mel Ferrer and Dorothy McGuire. This summer stock company presented productions in the La Jolla High School Auditorium from 1947 until 1964. In 1983, the La Jolla Playhouse re-opened in a new home at the University of California, San Diego, where it operates today. It has attracted Hollywood film stars on hiatus, both as performers and enthusiastic supporters, since its inception.

Peck's next release was the modest-budget, serious adult drama, The Macomber Affair (1947), in which he portrays an African hunting trip guide assisting a visiting couple. During the trip, the wife, played by Joan Bennett, becomes enamored with Peck, and the husband gets shot. Peck was very active in the development of the film, including recommending director Zoltan Korda. The film received positive reviews but was mostly overlooked by the public upon its release, which Peck would later say disappointed him.

In November 1947, Peck's next film, the landmark Gentleman's Agreement, directed by Elia Kazan, was released and was immediately proclaimed as "Hollywood's first major attack on anti-Semitism". Based on a novel, the film has Peck portraying a New York magazine writer who pretends to be Jewish so he can experience personally the hostility of bigots. It was nominated for eight Academy Awards, including Peck for Best Actor, winning in the Best Film and Best Director categories. It was the second-highest top-grossing film of 1948.  Peck would indicate in his later years that the film was one of his proudest works. Upon release, Gentleman's Agreement was widely praised for both its courageousness and its quality, Peck's performance has been described as very convincing by many critics, both upon release and in recent years. In recent decades, critics have expressed differing opinions regarding Peck's portrayal, the quality of the film by modern standard, and the film's effectiveness at addressing anti-semitism, with film writer Matt Bailey writing "Gentleman's Agreement may have been an important film at one time, but was never a good film,"

Peck's next three releases were each commercial disappointments. The Paradine Case (1947), was his second and last film with  Hitchcock. When producer David O. Selznick insisted on casting Peck for the movie, Hitchcock was apprehensive, questioning whether Peck could properly portray an English lawyer. In later years, Peck did not speak fondly of the making of the movie Released in 1947,The Paradine Case was a British-set courtroom drama about a defense lawyer in love with his client. It had an international cast including Charles Laughton, Ethel Barrymore and Alida Valli as the accused. The movie received positive reviews, many complimenting Peck's performance, but was panned by the public, only recouping half of the $4.2million production costs. In recent decades, the film was criticized by most prominent writers, although critic's praised Peck's acting. Writers Paul Condon and Jim Sangster stated that "Peck is vulnerable yet believable in a role that requires significant delicacy of touch to maintain viewer's loyalty and interest."

Peck shared top billing with Anne Baxter in the western Yellow Sky (1948), the namesake setting as the ghost town Peck's group of bank robbers seek refuge in, encountering the spunky tomboy, Baxter, and her grandfather, alongside their gold. Peck gradually develops an interest in Baxter's character, who in turn seems to rediscover her femininity and develops an interest in him. Critics which commented on Peck's performance felt it to be solid. as being slightly unbelievable, The film was only moderately commercially successful. A year later, Peck was paired with Ava Gardner for their first of three films together in The Great Sinner (1949), a period drama-romance where a Russian writer, Peck, becomes addicted to gambling while helping Gardner and her father pay back their debts. Peck ended up becoming great friends with Gardner, and would later declare her his favorite co-star. Their friendship lasted the rest of Gardner's life, and upon her death in 1990, Peck took in both her housekeeper and her dog. The film received unfavorable reviews usually describing it as dull, and the public was not interested, rendering it a commercial disappointment. In modern times, the film has received mixed reviews but TV Guide says "this often gripping film" has strong performances, that "Peck is powerful" in his portrayal. Peck initially rejected the film, his last movie under his MGM contract, eventually agreeing to do it as a favor to the studio's production head.

His second 1949 release, Twelve O'Clock High (1949), was the first of many films in which Peck embodied the brave, effective, yet human, "fighting man". Based on true events, Peck portrays the new commander of a U.S. World War II bomber squadron tasked with whipping the crew into shape, but then breaks down emotionally under the stress of the job.  The National Board of Review ranked it in their top ten films of the year and it received four Academy Awards nominations, Best Actor for Peck. Peck was later recognized in the New York Film Critics Circle for the role. Twelve O'Clock High was a commercial success finishing tenth in the 1950 box office rankings. The film received strong reviews upon release. Recent critics maintain positive opinions. Evaluations of Peck's performance were positive, with The New York Times describing "High and particular praise for Gregory Peck... Peck does an extraordinarily able job in revealing the hardness and the softness of a general exposed to peril." Film historian Peter von Bagh considers Peck's performance "as Brigadier General Frank Savage to be the most enduring of his life".

Worldwide fame (1950–1953)
Peck began the 1950s with two westerns, the first being The Gunfighter (1950), directed by Henry King, who had worked with him previously on Twelve O'Clock High. Peck plays an aging "Top Gun of the West" who is now weary of killing and wishes to retire with his alluring but pragmatic wife and his seven-year-old son, both of whom he has not seen for many years. Peck and King did much photographic research about the Wild West Era, discovering that most cowboys had facial hair, "bowl" haircuts and wore beat-up clothing; Peck subsequently wore a mustache while filming. The studio's president called for re-shoots upon seeing the initial footage due to the mustache, but backed out due to costs inflated by the production manager at King and Peck's persuasion. The Gunfighter did fair but disappointing business at the box office, earning $5.6million in receipts, the 47th most for 1951. 20th Century Fox's studio chief Darryl Zanuck blamed Peck's mustache for the lukewarm reaction from Peck's typical fans, stating that wanted to see usual handsome, clean-shaven Peck, not the authentic-cowboy Peck. The Gunfighter, received "solid reviews" upon release, with particular enthusiasm from some critics, and Peck's performance "bringing him some of his best notices". The New York Times wrote, "through Mr. Peck's fine performance, a fair comprehension is conveyed of the loneliness and the isolation of a man with a lurid name... an arresting and quite exciting film." The movie has grown in critical appreciation over the years and "is now considered one of the all-time classic westerns" Critics of recent decades uniformly praise Peck's performance, with David Parkinson of Radio Times saying "Peck gives a performance of characteristic dignity and grit."

Peck's next western was Only the Valiant (1951), a low-budget movie, for which Peck disliked the script and would later label as the low point of his career. Peck's non-exclusive contract with David O. Selznick permitted Selznick to sell his services to other studios, and Selznick sold his services to Warner Bros for this movie after he ran into financial difficulties. The plot of the film is listed as "an unpopular, strict leader gathers together a rag-tag group of men and leads them on an extremely dangerous mission, turning them into a well-oiled fighting machine by the end and earning respect along the way." Peck portrays a U.S. army captain and the mission is to protect an undermanned army fort against the attacking Apache. Peck's romantic interest was played by Barbara Payton. Variety's review said "In this cavalry yarn... great pains have been exerted to provide interesting characters. Peck makes the most of a colorful role." It earned a moderate $5.7million, ranking at 35th for the year. This little-remembered picture, today receives mixed reviews, although Peck's acting is praised.

Peck's second 1951 release was the book-to-film adaptation Captain Horatio Hornblower, featuring Peck as the commander of a warship in the British fleet during the Napoleonic Wars who finds romance with Virginia Mayo's character. Peck was attracted to the character, saying, "I thought Hornblower was an interesting character. I never believe in heroes who are unmitigated and unadulterated heroes, who never know the meaning of fear." The role had been originally intended for Errol Flynn, but he was felt to be too old by the time the project came to fruition. Captain Horatio Hornblower was a box office success, finishing ninth for the year in the UK and seventh in the North America. Peck's role in the film was largely praised by reviewers. The Associated Press stated that Peck provided "the proper dash and authenticity as the remarkable nineteenth-century skipper" and Variety later wrote "Peck stands out as a skilled artist, capturing the spirit of the character and atmosphere of the period." Modern reviews have given mixed reactions toward Peck's performance. Richard Gilliam of AllMovie argues, it is "an excellent performance from Gregory Peck" stating that "Peck brings his customary aura of intelligence and moral authority to the role," while the Radio Times asserts "Gregory Peck plays Hornblower as a high-principle stuff shirt and thus confounds director Raoul Walsh's efforts to inject some pace."

His third film with Henry King's direction, David and Bathsheba, a Biblical epic, was the top-grossing movie of 1951. The two-hit-movie punch of Horatio and David elevated Peck to the status of Hollywood mega-star. David and Bathsheba tells the story of David (Peck), who slew Goliath as a teenager; and, later, as beloved King, becomes infatuated with the married Bathsheba, played by Susan Hayward. Peck's performance in David and Bathsheba was evaluated upon release by The New York Times "as an authoritative performance," and Variety stated "Peck is a commanding personality... he shades his character expertly", In recent years, critics have argued that his "stiff" performance is made up for in charisma, but overall praised his strength in the role and Leonard Maltin says the movie has "only fair performances".  David and Bathsheba opened with positive reviews, including praise for avoiding excessive spectacle while remaining an epic with "dignified restraint".

Peck returned to swashbucklers in The World in His Arms (1952), directed by Raoul Walsh, who had also directed Captain Horatio Hornblower. Peck portrays a seal-hunting ship captain in 1850 San Francisco who romances a Russian countess played by Ann Blyth and ends up engaging a rival sealer played by Anthony Quinn in a sailing race to Alaska. The film was given positive reviews by both contemporary and modern critics. All Movie commented that Peck is "a superb actor, who brings enormous skill to the part, but who simply lacks the overt derring-do and danger that is part of the role." The film was moderately successful, more so in the UK than in North America.

He reunited with previous collaborators King, Hayward, and Gardner in The Snows of Kilimanjaro (1952), an adaptation of a short story by Ernest Hemingway. The film stars Peck as a self-concerned writer looking back on his life, particularly his romance with his  first wife (Gardner), while he slowly dies from an accidental wound while on an African hunting expedition with his current wife (Hayward) nursing him. The film was praised for its cinematography and direction. Most reviews praise Peck's performance, with TV Guide saying the story is "enacted with power and conviction by Peck," although some criticized his "bland" expressions. The Snows of Kilimanjaro was a box office hit and ranked as the fourth-highest-grossing movie of 1952.
 

Peck's "first real foray into comedy" was Roman Holiday (1953), directed by William Wyler. He portrayed American journalist Joe Bradley opposite Audrey Hepburn as a European princess in her first significant film role. Peck's role in Roman Holiday had originally been offered to Cary Grant, who turned it down because the part appeared to be more of a supporting role to the princess. Peck had the same concern, but was persuaded by Wyler that the on-site filming in Rome would be an exceptional experience, and accepted the part, even eventually insisting that Hepburn's name be above the title of the film (just beneath his) in the opening credits. Peck later stated that he had told his agent "I'm smart enough to know this girl's going to win the Oscar in her first picture, and I'm going to look like a damned fool if her name is not up there on top with mine."

Roman Holiday was a commercial success, finishing 22nd in the box office in 1953. The film continued to garner money after its release, with "modern sources noting it earned $10 million total at the box office". Critics praised Peck's performance; Bosley Crowther stated that "Peck makes a stalwart and manly escort... whose eyes belie his restrained exterior," while the Hollywood Reporter commented that "Peck turns in another of his outstanding performances playing the love-smitten reporter with intelligence and good-humored conviction;" The film was met with critical acclaim. It was nominated for multiple accolades, including 8 Academy Awards, with Hepburn winning for Best Actress; Peck also scored a BAFTA nomination for Foreign Actor. At the 1955  Golden Globe awards, Peck and Hepburn were named the World Film Favorite Award winners for their respective genders.

Overseas and New York (1954–1957)

With his acclaimed performance in The Gunfighter, Peck was offered the lead role in High Noon (1952) but turned it down because he did not want to become typecast as a Westerns actor. Peck was based in the United Kingdom for about eighteen months between 1953 and 1955; new tax laws had drastically raised the tax rate on high-income earners, but the tax amount due would be reduced if the payer worked outside the country for extended periods. After Roman Holidays production in Italy, his three subsequent films were shot and set in London, Germany and Southeast Asia, respectively. Peck starred in The Million Pound Note (1954), based on a Mark Twain short story. Peck enjoyed the film's production as "it was a good comedy opportunity" and "was given probably the most elegant wardrobe he had ever worn in film". He plays a penniless American seaman in 1903 London who is given a onemillion pound bank note by two rich, eccentric brothers who wish to ascertain if he can survive for one month without spending any of it. The film performed modestly at the box office and received mixed reviews for its production. Adrian Turner of the Radio Times praised it as a "lovely comedy" which "has a lot of charm and gentle humor, owing to Peck's evident delight in the role and the unobtrusive direction" adding it has a "witty script".

He portrayed  a US army colonel investigating the kidnapping of a young soldier in Night People (1954). Peck later stated that the role of was one of his favorites as his lines were "tough and crisp and full of wisecracks, and more aggressive than other roles" he'd played.  The film received praise for its production and direction, but did poorly at the box office. Peck flew to Sri Lanka to film The Purple Plain (1954), playing a Canadian bomber pilot with strong emotional problems during the Second World War. The Purple Plain was panned in the United States but became a hit in the United Kingdom, ranking tenth at the box office in 1954, and was nominated for a BAFTA Award for Outstanding British Film. Of his performance, Crowther wrote, "the extent of Peck's agony is impressively transmitted... in vivid and unrelenting scenes." In recent years, the movie "has become one of Peck's most respected works," with critic David Thomson rating Peck's performance as excellent. Craig Butler of All Movie describes "Peck is astonishing, giving the sort of layered, intense yet nuanced performance that deserves major awards".

In 1954, Peck was named the third most popular non-British film star in the United Kingdom. Peck did not have a film released in 1955. Peck made a comeback in the US. with  The Man in the Gray Flannel Suit (1956), in which he portrays a married, ex-soldier father of three who is increasingly haunted by his deeds in Italy during the Second World War. The film saw Peck reunited with Duel in the Sun co-star Jennifer Jones; during the filming of a scene where their characters argue, Jones clawed his face with her fingernails, prompting Peck to say to the director "I don't call that acting. I call it personal." The movie was successful, finishing eighth in box office gross for the year despite contemporary and modern reviews being mixed. Butler of AllMovie declared that "the role fits (Gregory Peck) as if it had been tailor-made for him. Peck's particular brilliance lies in the quiet strength that is so much a part of him and the way in which he uses subtle changes in that quietness to signal mammoth emotions. He's given ample opportunity to do so here and the results are enthralling... an exceptional performance". Radio Times refers to "the excellent Peck" and states Peck plays "the appealing flawed hero".

Peck next starred as Captain Ahab in the 1956 film adaptation of Herman Melville's Moby Dick; he was unsure about his suitability for the part but was persuaded by director John Huston to take the role. Peck almost drowned twice during filming in stormy weather off the sea coasts of Ireland and several other performers and crew members suffered injuries. John Huston was named best director of the year by the New York Film Critics Circle and the National Board of Review for Moby Dick, but did not receive a nomination for the Academy Award for Best Director. The movie had the ninth highest box office of the year in North America, but cost $4.5million to make, more than double the original budget, and was considered a commercial disappointment. In 2003, editor Barry Monush wrote, "There was, and continues to be, controversy over his casting as Ahab in Moby Dick." Upon opening, Variety said: "Peck often seems understated and much too gentlemanly for a man supposedly consumed by insane fury."The Hollywood Reporter argued "Peck plays it... in a brooding, smoldering vein, but none the less intensely and dynamically." In modern times, critics have said Peck is: "often mesmerizing"; "stoic" and "more than adequate"; " and "lending a deranged dignity" to the role. Peck himself later said "I wasn't mad enough, not crazy enough, not obsessive enough – I should have done more. At the time, I didn't have more in me."

For romantic comedy Designing Woman (1957), Peck was permitted to choose his leading lady: Lauren Bacall, who was content to be busy with work as her husband was gravely ill at the time. The film revolves around a fashion designer and a sports writer on Californian vacation who have a whirlwind romance and hasty marriage despite Peck's character already having a girlfriend back home, only to find out when they return to New York that they have vastly different lifestyles. The film was mildly successful and entered at 35th for annual gross, but did not break even. Upon release, Variety said "Bacall... is excellent... Peck is fine as the confused sportswriter" and added that all the other actors/actresses give top-notch performances. In recent years, the few reviews from prominent critics or websites are generally positive with TV Guide exclaiming "they've made... the famous stoneface... Peck, somewhat funny. Bacall gives an especially good performance." Designing Women won the  Academy Award for Best Original Screenplay.

Reflections on violence (1958–1959)

Peck's next movie, the western The Bravados (1958), reunited him with director Henry King after a six-year gap. King was widely considered to have produced some of Peck's best work; Peck once said "King was like an older brother, even a father figure. We communicated without talking anything to death. It was direction by osmosis." In The Bravados, Peck's character spends weeks pursuing four outlaws whom he believes raped and murdered his wife while agonizing over his own morals. The film was a moderate success, finishing in the top 20 of the box office for 1959. In recent years, the film and Peck's performance has received mixed reviews; with Time Out asserting that "Peck's "crisis of conscience... is worked out in perfunctory religious terms;" and TV Guide stating Peck's cowboy's "moment of truth is a powerful one and he gives it all the value it deserves, although much of his acting up to then had been lackluster".

In 1956, Peck made a foray into the film production business, organizing Melville Productions and later, Brentwood Productions. These companies produced five movies over seven years, all starring Peck, including Pork Chop Hill, for which Peck served as the executive producer. The films were observed by some as becoming more political, although Peck said he tried to avoid any "overt preachiness". In 1958, Peck and good friend William Wyler co-produced the western epic The Big Country (1958) separate from Peck's production company. The project ran into numerous issues; Wyler and Peck were dissatisfied with the script, which underwent almost daily revisions, causing stress for the performers. Peck and the screenwriters ended up rewriting the script after each day's shooting, causing stress for the performers, who would arrive the next day and find their lines and even entire scenes different than for what they had prepared. The stellar cast included Jean Simmons, Carrol Baker, Chuck Connors, Charlton Heston and Burl Ives; Ives won the Academy Award for Best Supporting Actor for his intense performance. There were disagreements between director Wyler and the performers, resulting in Peck storming off-set when Wyler refused to re-shoot a close-up scene. Peck and Wyler's relationship remained strained for three years after production. Peck said in 1974 that he had tried producing and acting simultaneously and felt "either it can't be done or it's just that I don't do it well".

The film itself was a big hit, finishing fourth at the domestic box office in 1958 and second in the UK. At the time of release, reviews for The Big Country were mixed, regarding the producers' prioritization of characterization versus technical filmmaking; opinions on Peck's performance were also disparate. In recent decades, critical opinion of The Big Country has generally risen although there is still disagreement; many prominent critics and publications describe the cinematography as excellent, some laud Peck's performance, and some cite the film as too long.

Peck's next feature was Pork Chop Hill (1959), based on true events depicted in a book. Peck portrays a lieutenant during the Korean War who is ordered to use his infantry company to take the strategically insignificant Pork Chop Hill, as its capture would strengthen the U.S.'s position in the almost-complete armistice negotiations. As executive producer, Peck recruited Lewis Milestone of All Quiet on the Western Front (1930) to direct. Many critics label it as an anti-war film; it has also been stated that "as shooting progressed it became clear Peck and Milestone had very different artistic visions." Peck later said the movie showed "the futility of settling political arguments by killing young men. We tried not to preach; we let it speak for itself." Despite solid reviews, the film did only fair business at the box office. Most critics, both upon Pork Chop Hills opening and in recent years, agree that it is a gritty, grim and realistic rendering of battle action. Three critics who comment on Peck's performance are laudatory, with Variety saying Peck's performance is "completely believable. He comes through as a born leader, and yet it is quite clear that he has moments of doubt and of uncertainty."

Peck's second release of 1959 cast him opposite Deborah Kerr in Beloved Infidel which as based on the memoirs of film columnist Sheilah Graham. The film portrays the romance between Graham (Kerr) and author F. Scott Fitzgerald (Peck) during the last three years of his life, towards the end of which Fitzgerald was often drunk and  abusive. Crowther assessed it as "generally flat and uninteresting" with a "postured performance of Gregory Peck... his grim-faced, monotony as a washout is relieved in a couple of critical scenes by some staggering and bawling as a drunkard, but that is hardly enough." Variety said that "the acting, while excellent and persuasive in parts, is shallow and artificial in others. Problem is primarily with Peck who brings to Fitzgerald the kind of clean-cut looks and youthful appearance that conflict with the image of a has-been novelist." Reviews from five prominent scribes in recent decades are similar, saying, Peck was blatantly miscast, with TV Guide specifying that because of their physical differences Craig Butler saying "Peck was an extremely talented actor, but there is nothing in his personality that matches the qualities associated with Fitzgerald.

Peck starred next in On the Beach (1959) alongside Ava Gardner in their third and final film together. The film is considered to be Hollywood's first major movie about the implications of nuclear warfare. Directed by Stanley Kramer and based on Neville Shute's best-selling book, it shows the last months of several people in Melbourne, Australia as they await the onset of radioactive fallout from nuclear bombs. Peck portrays a U.S. submarine commander who has brought his crew to Australia from the North Pacific Ocean after nuclear bombs had been detonated in the northern hemisphere, and who eventually romances Gardner's character. The film was named in the top ten lists of the National Board of Review and the New York Film Critics Circle and was successful at the North American box office finishing eighth for the year, but due to its high production cost it lost $700,000. On the Beach was praised by critics. In recent decades, critical opinion of On the Beach is mixed with some prominent critics asserting the script is poor, but some critics saying the acting, especially Peck, and cinematography are excellent, and that, overall, the film is powerful. Butler of AllMovie writes, "...problematic is the clichéd, almost soap-operatic relationship between Gregory Peck and Ava Gardner and the somewhat melodramatic handling of other sections of the film... The cast helps tremendously. Peck has rarely been more stalwart... Even decades after its release, Beach is a harrowing and devastating experience."

Second commercial and critical peak (1960–1964)
Peck's first release of 1961 was The Guns of Navarone. A J. Lee Thompson-directed World War II drama, it depicts Peck's six-man commando team, which includes David Niven and Anthony Quinn, undertaking a mission to destroy two seemingly impregnable German-controlled artillery guns on Navarone Island. The team of specialists (Peck is the mountain climbing expert) needs to destroy the guns so British ships can evacuate 2,000 trapped British soldiers across the Aegean Sea. During filming Peck said his team seems to defeat "the entire German army" which approached parody, and he concluded that cast members had to "play their roles with complete conviction" to make the film convincing. The film was the top-grossing movie of 1961, and became "one of the most popular adventure movies of its day". It landed seven Academy Award nominations, winning for Best Special Effects; other accolades include the Golden Globe Award for Best Dramatic Movie and the BAFTA for Best British Screenplay.

Critics praised The Guns of Navarone, it being named the best picture of the year in Film Daily's annual poll of critics and industry reporters in 1961. In recent decades, most prominent critics or publications give it positive reviews Paul V. Peckly of The New York Herald Tribune wrote, "Peck may seem at times a trifle wooden and his German accent too obviously American.... but his not too introspective, somewhat baffled manner is manly and fitted to the role he plays.

Peck's next film was Cape Fear (1962), produced by Melville Productions. Peck portrays a lawyer whose witness testimony convicted Robert Mitchum's character, who upon being released from prison after serving eight years for sexual assault, threatens to get back at Peck through his wife and daughter, and meticulously terrorizes the family. Peck was anxious to have Mitchum in the role of Cady, but Mitchum declined at first and only relented after Peck and Thompson delivered a case of bourbon to Mitchum's home. Many cuts were made to the movie to satisfy censorship codes in the US and UK. The film grossed only $5million at the North American box office, 47th for the year. 
 Crowther and Variety gave Cape Fear solid reviews. Crowther said, Both expressed satisfaction with Peck's performance, although Variety noted he could have been a little more stressed by the occurrences. Other reviews were mixed due to the movie's disturbing nature, including The New Yorker. In recent decades, reviews have been generally positive. Critics commented on Peck's performance in Cape Fear, with TV Guide saying "Peck is careful not to act the fear; he's an interesting foe for Mitchum."

After Cape Fear, Peck planned to make his directorial debut with They're a Weird Mob but eventually did not make the film.

Peck's next role was in the 1962 film adaptation of Harper Lee's Pulitzer Prize-winning novel To Kill a Mockingbird, playing the role of the kind and scrupulously honest lawyer-father, Atticus Finch. This perfomance saw his fifth and final Academy Award nomination, for which he won Best Actor. The film received a further seven nominations including for Best Picture, Director and Cinematography, also winning Adapted Screenplay and Art Direction. At the Golden Globes, Peck won for Best Actor in a Drama and the film was nominated for Best Film and Director; the film was nominated for Best Film at the BAFTAs. The film was a commercial success as the sixth-highest-grossing film of the year. In 2003, Atticus Finch, as portrayed by Peck, was named the greatest film hero of the past 100 years by the American Film Institute. Peck would later say of To Kill A Mockingbird: "My favorite film, without any question."

When producer Alan J. Pakula and director Robert Mulligan approached Peck about taking the role of Atticus Finch in To Kill a Mockingbird, Peck agreed to read the book. He stated "I got started on it and of course I sat up all night and read straight through it... I called them at about eight o'clock in the morning and said 'When do I start? Peck did eventually request changes so that film deviated somewhat from the book, mainly showing more scenes of Peck in the courtroom than were in the original rough cut, thus shifting the focus away from the children, who had been the focus of the book, and more towards Atticus Finch.  Peck's performance received universal acclaim from critics. Variety wrote that the role was especially challenging for Peck but that he "not only succeeds, but makes it appear effortless, etching a portrayal of strength, dignity and intelligence." The Hollywood Reporter said "Peck gives probably the finest performance of his career, understated, casual, effective." Time posited "Peck, though he is generally excellent, lays it on a bit thick at times – he seems to imagine himself the Abe Lincoln of Alabama." Reviews in recent decades have similarly lauded Peck's performance, with Film Monthly observing, "Gregory Peck's performance as lawyer Atticus Finch is just as beautiful, natural, and nuanced as the movie itself." Both Michael Gebert and Andrew Collins of Radio Times refer to Atticus Finch as the role that defined Peck's career.

Mature years and later work (1965–2000)
Peck served as the president of the Academy of Motion Picture Arts and Sciences in 1967, Chairman of the Board of Trustees of the American Film Institute from 1967 to 1969, Chairman of the Motion Picture and Television Relief Fund in 1971, and National Chairman of the American Cancer Society in 1966. He was a member of the National Council on the Arts from 1964 to 1966.

Peck's rare attempts at villainous roles were not acclaimed. Early on, he played the renegade son in the Western Duel in the Sun, and, later in his career, the infamous Nazi doctor Josef Mengele in The Boys from Brazil. In the 1980s, Peck moved to television, where he starred in the mini-series The Blue and the Gray, playing Abraham Lincoln. He also starred with Christopher Plummer, John Gielgud, and Barbara Bouchet in the television film The Scarlet and The Black, about Monsignor Hugh O'Flaherty, a real-life Catholic priest in the Vatican who smuggled Jews and other refugees away from the Nazis during World War II.

Peck, Mitchum, and Martin Balsam all had roles in the 1991 remake of Cape Fear, directed by Martin Scorsese. In the remake, Peck played Max Cady's lawyer. His last prominent film role also came in 1991, in Other People's Money, directed by Norman Jewison and based on the stage play of that name. Peck played a business owner trying to save his company against a hostile takeover bid by a Wall Street liquidator played by Danny DeVito.

Peck retired from active film-making after the film. Peck spent the last few years of his life touring the world doing speaking engagements in which he would show clips from his movies and take questions from the audience. He came out of retirement for a 1998 mini-series version of one of his most famous films, Moby Dick, portraying Father Mapple (played by Orson Welles in the 1956 version), with Patrick Stewart as Captain Ahab, the role Peck played in the earlier film. It was his final performance, and it won him the Golden Globe for Best Supporting Actor in a Series, Miniseries, or Television Film. Peck had been offered the role of Grandpa Joe in the 2005 film Charlie and the Chocolate Factory, but died before he could accept it. The Irish actor David Kelly was then given the part.

Politics
In 1947, while many Hollywood figures were being blacklisted for similar activities, Peck signed a letter deploring a House Un-American Activities Committee investigation of alleged communists in the film industry. A life-long Democrat, Peck was suggested in 1970 as a possible Democratic candidate to run against Ronald Reagan for the office of California Governor. Although he later admitted that he had no interest in being a candidate himself for public office, Peck encouraged one of his sons, Carey Peck, to run for political office. He was defeated both times by slim margins in races in 1978 and 1980 against Republican U.S. Representative Bob Dornan, another former actor.

Peck revealed that former President Lyndon Johnson had told him that, had he sought re-election in 1968, he intended to offer Peck the post of U.S. ambassador to Ireland – a post Peck, owing to his Irish ancestry, said he might well have taken, saying, "[It] would have been a great adventure". The actor's biographer Michael Freedland substantiates the report, and says that Johnson indicated that his presentation of the Medal of Freedom to Peck would perhaps make up for his inability to confer the ambassadorship. President Richard Nixon, though, placed Peck on his "enemies list", owing to Peck's liberal activism.

Peck was outspoken against the Vietnam War, while remaining supportive of his son, Stephen, who fought there. In 1972, Peck produced the film version of Daniel Berrigan's play The Trial of the Catonsville Nine about the prosecution of a group of Vietnam protesters for civil disobedience. Despite his reservations about American general Douglas MacArthur as a man, Peck had long wanted to play him on film, and did so in MacArthur in 1976. Peck was a close friend of French president Jacques Chirac.

In 1978, Peck traveled to Alabama, the setting of To Kill a Mockingbird, to campaign for Democratic U.S. Senate nominee Donald W. Stewart of Anniston, who defeated the Republican candidate, James D. Martin, a former U.S. representative from Gadsden. In 1987, Peck undertook the voice-overs for television commercials opposing President Ronald Reagan's Supreme Court nomination of judge Robert Bork. Bork's nomination was defeated. Peck was also a vocal supporter of a worldwide ban of nuclear weapons, and a life-long advocate of gun control.

Documents declassified in 2017 show that the National Security Agency had created a biographical file on Peck as part of its monitoring of prominent US citizens.

Personal life 

In October 1942, Peck married Finnish-born Greta Kukkonen (1911–2008), with whom he had three sons: Jonathan (1944–1975), Stephen (b. 1946), and Carey Paul (b. 1949). They were divorced in December 1955. Peck's eldest son was found dead in his home on June 26, 1975, in what authorities believed was a suicide.

During his first marriage, Peck had a brief affair with Spellbound co-star Ingrid Bergman. He confessed the affair to Brad Darrach of People in a 1987 interview, saying: "All I can say is that I had a real love for her [Bergman], and I think that's where I ought to stop... I was young. She was young. We were involved for weeks in close and intense work."

On New Year's Eve in 1955, the day after his divorce was final, Peck married Véronique Passani (1932–2012), a Paris news reporter who had interviewed him in 1952 before he went to Italy to film Roman Holiday. He asked her to lunch six months later, and they became inseparable. They had a son, Anthony Peck (b. 1956), and a daughter, Cecilia Peck (b. 1958). The couple remained married until Gregory Peck's death. His son Anthony is a former husband of supermodel Cheryl Tiegs. Peck had grandchildren from both marriages. One of his grandsons from his first marriage is actor Ethan Peck.

Peck was the owner of thoroughbred steeplechase race horses. In 1963, Owen's Sedge finished seventh in the Grand National. Another of his horses, Different Class, raced in the 1968 Grand National The horse was favored, but finished third.

Peck was Roman Catholic, and once considered entering the priesthood. Later in his career, a journalist asked Peck if he was a practicing Catholic. Peck answered: "I am a Roman Catholic. Not a fanatic, but I practice enough to keep the franchise. I don't always agree with the Pope... There are issues that concern me, like abortion, contraception, the ordination of women... and others." His second marriage was performed by a justice of the peace, not by a priest, because the Church prohibits remarriage if the first spouse is still living and the first marriage was not annulled. Peck was a significant fund-raiser for the missionary work of a priest friend of his (Father Albert O'Hara), and served as co-producer of a cassette recording of the New Testament with his son Stephen.

Death and legacy

On June 12, 2003, Peck died in his sleep from bronchopneumonia at the age of 87 at his home in Los Angeles. His wife, Veronique, was by his side.

Gregory Peck is entombed in the Cathedral of Our Lady of the Angels mausoleum in Los Angeles. His eulogy was read by Brock Peters, whose character, Tom Robinson, was defended by Peck's Atticus Finch in To Kill a Mockingbird. Celebrities who attended Peck's funeral included Lauren Bacall, Sidney Poitier, Harry Belafonte, Shari Belafonte, Harrison Ford, Calista Flockhart, Mike Farrell, Shelley Fabares, Jimmy Smits, Louis Jourdan, Dyan Cannon, Stephanie Zimbalist, Michael York, Angie Dickinson, Larry Gelbart, Michael Jackson, Anjelica Huston, Lionel Richie, Louise Fletcher, Tony Danza, and Piper Laurie.

The Gregory Peck Award for Cinematic Excellence was created by the Peck family in 2008 to commemorate their father by honoring a director, producer or actor's life's work. Originally presented at the Dingle International Film Festival in his ancestral home in Dingle, Ireland, since 2014 it has been presented at the San Diego International Film Festival in the city where he was born and raised. Recipients include Gabriel Byrne, Laura Dern, Alan Arkin, Annette Bening, Patrick Stewart and Laurence Fishburne.

Acting credits and awards

According to the American Film Institute, the Academy of Motion Picture Arts and Sciences, and the Hollywood Foreign Press Association, Peck's most significant works include Days of Glory (1944), The Keys of the Kingdom (1945), Spellbound (1945), The Yearling (1946), Gentleman's Agreement (1947), Twelve O'Clock High (1949), The Gunfighter (1950), The Snows of Kilimanjaro (1952),  Roman Holiday (1953), The Big Country (1958), Moby Dick (1956), Designing Woman (1957), The Guns of Navarone (1961), Cape Fear (1962), To Kill a Mockingbird (1962), Arabesque (1966), Mackenna's Gold (1969), The Omen (1976) and Old Gringo (1989). Among his television projects are The Blue and the Gray (1982) The Scarlet and the Black (1983) and Moby Dick (miniseries 1998). On stage, Peck appeared in Gas Light at the La Jolla Playhouse and The Will Rogers Follies at the Palace Theatre.

Peck received five total Academy Award nominations for The Keys of the Kingdom (1945), The Yearling (1946), Gentleman's Agreement (1947) and Twelve O'Clock High (1949) before winning Best Actor for his performance in To Kill a Mockingbird (1962). In 1967, he received their Jean Hersholt Humanitarian Award.  He received eight competitive nominations for Golden Globe Awards that recognised his work in The Yearling (1946), To Kill a Mockingbird (1962), Captain Newman, M.D. (1964), MacArthur (1977), The Boys from Brazil (1978) and the 1998 miniseries Moby Dick. Peck's five wins included the Golden Globe for Best Actor twice as well as one Golden Globe Award for Best Supporting Actor – Series, Miniseries or Television Film, and he was honored with their Cecil B. DeMille Award in 1969.

In 1969, President Lyndon B. Johnson honored Peck with the Presidential Medal of Freedom, the nation's highest civilian honor. In 1998, Peck received the National Medal of Arts from President Bill Clinton for his contributions to acting. During his lifetime, he also was a recipient of the AFI Life Achievement Award, the Screen Actors Guild Life Achievement Award and the Kennedy Center Honors. For his contribution to the motion picture industry, Gregory Peck has a star on the Hollywood Walk of Fame at 6100 Hollywood Boulevard. In November 2005, the star was stolen, and has since been replaced.

Archives
Peck donated his personal collection of home movies and prints of his feature films to the Film Archive of the Academy of Motion Picture Arts and Sciences in 1999. The film material at the Academy Film Archive is complemented by printed materials in the Gregory Peck papers at the Academy's Margaret Herrick Library.

See also
 List of Gregory Peck performances
 List of Presidential Medal of Freedom recipients

Notes

References

Bibliography

External links

 Gregory Peck Official Website  – The Gregory Peck Foundation
 
 
 
 Gregory Peck Daily Telegraph obituary
 Gregory Peck in the 1920 US Census , 1930 US Census , and the Social Security Death Index .
 Gregory Peck papers, Margaret Herrick Library, Academy of Motion Picture Arts and Sciences
 Gregory Peck interview on BBC Radio 4 Desert Island Discs, August 8, 1980
 Image of Sidney Poitier holding his Oscar alongside Gregory Peck, Annabella and Anne Bancroft backstage at the Academy Awards, Los Angeles, 1964.  Los Angeles Times Photographic Archive (Collection 1429). UCLA Library Special Collections, Charles E. Young Research Library, University of California, Los Angeles.

1916 births
2003 deaths
20th Century Studios contract players
20th-century American male actors
21st-century American male actors
Activists from California
AFI Life Achievement Award recipients
American anti–Vietnam War activists
American male film actors
American male stage actors
American people of English descent
American people of Irish descent
American people of Scottish descent
American racehorse owners and breeders
Best Actor Academy Award winners
Best Drama Actor Golden Globe (film) winners
Best Supporting Actor Golden Globe (television) winners
Burials at the Cathedral of Our Lady of the Angels
California Democrats
Catholics from California
Cecil B. DeMille Award Golden Globe winners
César Honorary Award recipients
David di Donatello Career Award winners
David di Donatello winners
Deaths from bronchopneumonia
Honorary Golden Bear recipients
Deaths from pneumonia in California
Jean Hersholt Humanitarian Award winners
Screen Actors Guild Life Achievement Award
Kennedy Center honorees
Male actors from San Diego
Male Western (genre) film actors
Neighborhood Playhouse School of the Theatre alumni
People from La Jolla, San Diego
Presidential Medal of Freedom recipients
Presidents of the Academy of Motion Picture Arts and Sciences
San Diego State University alumni
United States National Medal of Arts recipients
University of California, Berkeley alumni
San Diego High School alumni